Zardari is a Baloch tribe from Pakistan. Zardari tribe originally belongs to a clan living in Sindh and Balochistan.

References

Baloch tribes
Ethnic groups in Pakistan